Head of Administration (Governor) of Krasnodar Krai is the highest post of executive power in Krasnodar Krai, a federal subject of Russia.

List of Heads of Administration

Elections

Last elections
The latest election for the office was held on 13 September 2020.

References 

 
Politics of Krasnodar Krai
Krasnodar Krai